The 1940 World Professional Basketball Tournament was the second edition of the World Professional Basketball Tournament. It was held in Chicago, Illinois, during the days of 18-22 March 1940 and featured 13 teams. It was won by the Harlem Globetrotters who defeated the Chicago Bruins 31–29 in the title game. The Washington Heurich Brewers came in third after beating the Syracuse Reds 41–30 in the third-place game. Sonny Boswell of the Harlem Globetrotters was named the tournaments Most Valuable Player.

Results

First round
18 March - Chicago Bruins 45, Fort Wayne Harvesters 27
18 March - Sheboygan Redskins 44, Rochester Seagrams 32
18 March - Harlem Globetrotters 50, Kenosha Royals 26
18 March - New York Rens 42, Canton Bulldogs 21
18 March - Oshkosh All-Stars 42, Benton Harbor House of David 23
18 March - Waterloo Wonders 41, Clarksburg Oil 32

Bracket

Third place game

Championship game

Individual awards

All-Tournament First team
C - Leroy Edwards, Oshkosh All-Stars
F - Sonny Boswell, Harlem Globetrotters (MVP)
F - Wibs Kautz, Chicago Bruins
G - Phil Rabin, Washington Heurich Brewers
G - Pop Gates, New York Rens

References

External links
WPBT 1939-48 on apbr.org

World Professional Basketball Tournament